

Higher secondary courses
In two-year higher secondary courses in Arts and Commerce with two core subjects (English and any one MIL Bengali/Assamese/Manipuri/Hindi or alternative English (in lieu of MIL)), three elective subjects are offered.

References

http://www.topuniversityguide.com/university/318577408236542/M%20A%20Laskar%20Junior%20College,%20Bhaga%20Bazar

Educational institutions established in 1993
Universities and colleges in Assam
Silchar
1993 establishments in Assam